Football at the 1965 Maccabiah Games was held in several stadiums in Israel starting on 30 August.

The competition was open for men's teams only. Teams from 9 countries participated. The competition was won by Israel. 

As part of the closing ceremony, an exhibition match was played between Israel and Torino F.C., which resulted with a 2–1 victory to Israel.

Format
The nine teams were divided into three groups, each team playing the others once. The top team from each group qualified to the medals group, while the second-placed team qualified to the 4th-6th place group. The bottom team in each group was eliminated.

Results

First round

Group A

Group B

Group C

Final round

4th-6th places group

Medals group

1. The match between the UK and Mexico was abandoned at the 71st minute, after Mexico conceded a penalty, and their goalkeeper was sent off as he protested the decision. The result at the time of abandonment was 1–1. The Games Committee set the result to 3–0 to the UK.

Final ranking

References

1965
Maccabiah Games